is a Japanese manga series by Dragon Odawara. It ran from 2005 to 2011. It has since been followed by two sequels Wild Cherry Nights and Cherry Nights R.

It was adapted into a live action television drama series in 2010.

Manga
Cherry Nights is written and illustrated by Dragon Odawara. It was serialized in Weekly Young Magazine from 2005 to 2011. A sequel Wild Cherry Nights was serialized from 2011 to 2012. A third series, Cherry Nights R was serialized from 2012 to 2014.

Volume list

Cherry Nights

Wild Cherry Nights

References

External links
 Official TV drama website 

2010 Japanese television series debuts
2010 Japanese television series endings
Japanese television dramas based on manga
2005 manga
Comedy anime and manga
Seinen manga